One Hundred Thousand Whys  is a popular science book series in China, mostly intended for children. The series is named after former Soviet Union Writer 's  (Sto tysyach pochemu, literally "A Hundred Thousand Whys"), also published in English as 100,000 Whys: A Trip Around the Room.

History

Soviet version 
A 1938 translation was also published by Zhen Bin. The Kaiming version was a big hit, so the publisher kept revising it and adding new content. By 1949 it was on its tenth revision.

Chinese versions 
In 1958, Shanghai Youth and Children's Press planned a large popular science book series and invited over 200 authors to contribute. The first edition was published in 1960, with volumes in Math, Physics, Chemistry, Astronomy and Meteorology, Agriculture, Zoology, Geology, and Health. A third of the book was written by Ye Yonglie, who contributed over 300 topics. By 1964 it had been reprinted 11 times and totalled 5.8 million copies. Six additional volumes were published between 1964 and 1966.

In 1971 the third edition, called the "work, farmer and soldier" edition, was published by Shanghai People's Press, with 21 volumes. This version has a lot of political content, such as frequent quotes from Mao Zedong. The political content is largely dropped in revisions after the Cultural Revolution.

By 2000, the series had printed over ten million copies and over 100 million volumes. Shanghai Youth and Children's Press tried to trademark the title, but the application was denied because it had become a common book title. There are over 500 versions of books with this title from various publishing houses, according to the Beijing Kaijuan Book Market Research Institute.

References

Popular science books
Education in China
Chinese non-fiction books
1934 non-fiction books
1960 non-fiction books
Works by Soviet writers
Works by Chinese writers
Series of non-fiction books